The 2020 Mainland Tactix season saw the Mainland Tactix netball team compete in the 2020 ANZ Premiership. As part of their pre-season preparations, Tactix competed in the 2019 Netball New Zealand Super Club, finishing the tournament in sixth place. With a team coached by Marianne Delaney-Hoshek, captained by Jane Watson and featuring Ellie Bird, Temalisi Fakahokotau, Erikana Pedersen, Kimiora Poi and Te Paea Selby-Rickit, Tactix finished the regular ANZ Premiership season in second place, qualifying for their first grand final. However, in the grand final, Tactix lost to Central Pulse 43–31.

Players

Player movements

2020 roster

Pre-season

2019 Super Club
In December 2019, Mainland Tactix together with the other five ANZ Premiership teams plus Collingwood Magpies from Suncorp Super Netball and Wasps Netball from the Netball Superleague competed in the 2019 Netball New Zealand Super Club. Tactix finished the tournament in sixth place.

Group B
Matches

Final ladder

5th/8th place classification
Semi-finals

5th/6th place match

Canterbury Men's Invitational
Mainland Tactix played a Canterbury Men's Invitational team in an exhibition.

Queenstown series
Mainland Tactix played matches against Central Pulse and Southern Steel in Queenstown.

Otaki tournament
Mainland Tactix participated in the official ANZ Premiership tournament at Te Wānanga o Raukawa in Otaki between 28 February and 1 March. All six ANZ Premiership teams took part.

Regular season

Fixtures and results
Round 1
 
Round 2

Round 3

Round 4
 
Round 5

Round 6

Round 7

Round 8
 

Round 9

Round 10

Final standings

Finals Series

Grand final

Award winners

New Zealand Netball Awards

Team of the season
Two Tactix players were included in Stuff's team of the season, selected by Brendon Egan.

References

2020
2020 ANZ Premiership season
2020 in New Zealand netball